Allan Bentsen (born 21 August 1968) is a Danish table tennis player. He won the European championship for national teams with Michael Maze and Finn Tugwell in 2005, defeating Zheng Weiching from Austria in the last and decisive match. He also competed at age 44 in the 2012 Summer Olympics in the Men's singles, but was defeated in the first round.

References

External links
 
 
 
 

1968 births
Living people
Danish male table tennis players
Olympic table tennis players of Denmark
Table tennis players at the 2012 Summer Olympics
Sportspeople from Odense
21st-century Danish people